NSW Kiama was a steam locomotive seeing service in New South Wales.

History
Davenport 1596 was ordered for construction operations as PWD No. 65 on Cordeaux Dam light railway between the Nepean Gorge near Douglas Park and the Dam along Mount Keira Road between 1917 and 1926. The Locomotive was purchased by Quarries Ltd. during 1936 and transferred to Kiama Blue Metal tramway.

Demise and Preservation
The Kiama tramway closed in March 1941. The locomotive was utilised by several heritage organisations and finally preserved by Illawarra Light Railway Museum in 1977.

References

Further reading
 

2 ft gauge locomotives
0-4-0 locomotives
Kiama